"The Tagger" is the second episode of the first season of the American television police sitcom series Brooklyn Nine-Nine. It is the 2nd overall episode of the series and is written by  Norm Hiscock and directed by Craig Zisk. It aired on Fox in the United States on September 24, 2013.

The show revolves around the fictitious 99th precinct of the New York Police Department in Brooklyn and the officers and detectives that work in the precinct. Jake Peralta (Andy Samberg) is an immature yet very talented detective in the precinct with an astounding record of crimes solved, putting him in a competition with fellow detective Amy Santiago (Melissa Fumero). The precinct's status changes when the Captain is retiring and a new commanding officer, Cpt. Raymond Holt (Andre Braugher) is appointed as the newest Captain. This puts a conflict between Jake and Holt for their respective methods in the field. In the episode, Captain Holt assigns Jake to a graffiti case after he arrives late to work, which he considers to be below his level. However, the case is more difficult than expected given the perpetrator's relation to a big figure. Meanwhile, Charles Boyle (Joe Lo Truglio) gets taunted by a psychic (Artemis Pebdani), who states that his love for Rosa Diaz (Stephanie Beatriz) will remain unrequited.

The episode was seen by an estimated 4.03 million household viewers and gained a 1.8/5 ratings share among adults aged 18–49, according to Nielsen Media Research. It received positive reviews, with critics praising Andy Samberg's and Joe Lo Truglio's performances in the episode.

Plot
Jake Peralta (Andy Samberg) arrives late to work and is confronted by Raymond Holt (Andre Braugher) for his recent misbehavior and scolded for his lack of proper work. As punishment, Peralta is assigned to a graffiti case where a person draws penises on police cruisers, with Holt acting as his "babysitter." Gina Linetti (Chelsea Peretti) introduces her friend, Carlene (Artemis Pebdani), to the gang, who claims to be a psychic. Charles Boyle (Joe Lo Truglio) is told by Carlene that Rosa Diaz (Stephanie Beatriz) will never love him.

Peralta and Holt set up a stakeout and pursue the tagger, managing to catch him. However, while preparing the report, Peralta discovers that the tagger is Trevor Podolski (Michael Grant), the Deputy Commissioner's son, and fears retaliation from the Deputy Commissioner if Trevor is arrested. Meanwhile, Boyle, Amy Santiago (Melissa Fumero) and Diaz raid an apartment as part of a drug bust. Boyle becomes paranoid when he finds that the psychic managed to predict many items in the apartment and wonders if Rosa truly does not love him. The psychic later tells Boyle that if he gets up from a chair, he will receive a severe injury. Rosa then punches Boyle while he is still seated, proving to him that the psychic was wrong.

Podolski (James Michael Connor) arrives at the precinct, demanding Trevor's release. He refuses to read Peralta's report and walks out of the precinct with Trevor. Peralta gets counsel on the case from Holt, who comments that Trevor can get away with anything thanks to his father's position. After getting enough evidence about Trevor's past crimes, Peralta and Holt arrive at Podolski's home and arrest Trevor. On another day, Holt holds a briefing and roll call. As the briefing and roll call begins, Peralta exits from a tent inside the precinct. He was sleeping in it so he could arrive to work on time.

Reception

Viewers
In its original American broadcast, "The Tagger" was seen by an estimated 4.03 million household viewers and gained a 1.8/5 ratings share among adults aged 18–49, according to Nielsen Media Research. This was a 35% decrease in viewership from the previous episode, which was watched by 6.17 million viewers with a 2.6/8 in the 18-49 demographics. This means that 1.8 percent of all households with televisions watched the episode, while 5 percent of all households watching television at that time watched it. With these ratings, Brooklyn Nine-Nine was the second most watched show on FOX for the night, beating Dads and The Mindy Project but behind New Girl, fourth on its timeslot and tenth for the night in the 18-49 demographics, behind New Girl, Trophy Wife, Person of Interest, Chicago Fire, NCIS: Los Angeles, The Goldbergs, NCIS, Agents of S.H.I.E.L.D., and The Voice.

Critical reviews
"The Tagger" received positive reviews from critics. Roth Cornet of IGN gave the episode a "good" 7.5 out of 10 and wrote, "Brooklyn Nine-Nines still finding its footing, but as compared to the pilot, this week's episode served-up an equal number of smiles with a few more laughs in the mix."

Molly Eichel of The A.V. Club gave the episode a "B" grade and wrote, "The importance of 'The Tagger' is that it gives the Nine-Nine its first real villain in the form of Deputy Commissioner Podolski. He vows to keep an eye on Holt and Peralta for arresting his son. It's an interesting first villain. It's not the criminals who pose the biggest threat, but bureaucracy and authority."

Aaron Channon of Paste gave the episode a 7.5 out of 10 and wrote, "What 'The Tagger' lacked in legitimate laugh-out-loud humor — there were certainly laughs, just not enough — it made up for in rounding the pilot's caricatures into genuine and more interesting people. The series hasn't hit its stride just yet, but it's getting there, one baby step at a time."

References

External links

2013 American television episodes
Brooklyn Nine-Nine (season 1) episodes